Claude Darbos (born 10 October 1936 in Saint-Paul-lès-Dax and died 7 November 2016 in the same town) was a French rugby union player who played for winger. He completed his entire career with the French club of the US Dax.

Biography 
Claude Darbos joins the US Dax in junior category.

He is the brother of Pierre Darbos, also a rugby player.

During his career at the top level, he played in 1961 and 1963 the final of the championship of France, but did not win. After retirement, he became a coach at the US Dax rugby school.

He died on November 7, 2016 at the age of 80.

Finalist 
 France championship :
 Finalist in 1961 and 1963.

References

External links 
Claude Darbos on finalesrugby.com

1936 births
2016 deaths
French rugby union players
US Dax players
Sportspeople from Landes (department)
People from Dax, Landes
Rugby union wings